
Gmina Gościeradów is a rural gmina (administrative district) in Kraśnik County, Lublin Voivodeship, in eastern Poland.

Villages
Gmina Gościeradów contains the villages and settlements of Aleksandrów, Gościeradów, Gościeradów Plebański, Gościeradów-Folwark, Gościeradów-Kolonia, Księżomierz, Księżomierz Gościeradowska, Księżomierz Kościelna, Księżomierz-Kolonia, Księżomierz-Osada, Łany, Liśnik Duży, Liśnik Duży-Kolonia, Marynopole, Mniszek, Salomin, Suchodoły, Szczecyn, Wólka Gościeradowska and Wólka Szczecka.

Neighbouring gminas
Gmina Gościeradów is bordered by the gminas of Annopol, Dzierzkowice, Radomyśl nad Sanem, Trzydnik Duży and Zaklików.

References

 Polish official population figures 2006

Goscieradow
Kraśnik County